HMS M28  was a First World War Royal Navy M15-class monitor. She was sunk during the Battle of Imbros in 1918.

Design

Intended as a shore bombardment vessel, M28s primary armament was a single 9.2 inch Mk VI gun removed from the  HMS Grafton. In addition to her 9.2-inch gun, she also possessed one 12 pounder and one six-pound anti-aircraft gun. She was equipped with a four-shaft Bolinder four-cylinder semi-diesel engine with 640 horsepower that allowed a top speed of eleven knots. The monitor's crew consisted of sixty-nine officers and men.

Construction

HMS M28 was laid down at the Sir Raylton Dixon & Co. Ltd shipyard at Govan on 1 March 1915.  She was then launched on 28 June 1915, and completed in August, 1915.

Career
 

During most of her service in the First World War M28 was attached to the Aegean Squadron and tasked with coastal bombardment of Turkish positions. On 21 October 1915 she bombarded the Bulgarian port of Dedeagatch. The former  and  managed to trap M28 and Raglan in the bay and engage them in what became known as the Battle of Imbros. As a result of the battle M28 was sunk and suffered 11 of her crew killed while the rest were rescued by Allied vessels.

References

 
 Jane's Fighting Ships of World War One (1919), Jane's Publishing Company
 Dittmar, F. J. & Colledge, J. J., "British Warships 1914–1919", (Ian Allan, London, 1972), 

 

M15-class monitors
1915 ships
World War I monitors of the United Kingdom
Royal Navy ship names
Ships built on the River Clyde
World War I shipwrecks in the Aegean Sea
Maritime incidents in 1918